Lecithocera cratophanes is a moth in the family Lecithoceridae. It was described by Edward Meyrick in 1929. It is found in southern Vietnam.

The wingspan is about 21 mm. The forewings are dark fuscous, irrorated (sprinkled) with ochreous whitish. There is a short suffused whitish-ochreous streak from the base beneath the costa. The discal stigmata are cloudy and dark fuscous and the costal edge is tinged with ochreous yellow from one-third to near the apex. The hindwings are rather dark grey.

References

Moths described in 1929
cratophanes